Cinders is a 1926 British silent comedy film directed by Louis Mercanton and starring Betty Balfour, Fred Wright and André Roanne. A servant in a London boarding house loses her job and accompanies one of the lodgers to his newly acquired casino on the French Riviera.

Cast
 Betty Balfour - Cinders
 Fred Wright - Professor Pottiefax
 André Roanne - Richard Dalrey
 Louis Baron - Ferraro
 Lucy Sibley - Mrs Catchpole
 Irene Tripod - Boarder
 Albert Decoeur - Manager
 Louis Lerton - Chef
 Jean Mercanton - Groom

References

External links

1926 films
1920s English-language films
Films directed by Louis Mercanton
1926 comedy films
British comedy films
Films set in London
British black-and-white films
British silent feature films
Silent comedy films
1920s British films